Ralph Clive (c. 1520 in Walford, Shropshire – 1582) was a former MP in Cornwall, representing West Looe constituency. He was elected in the October 1553 United Kingdom general election but did not return to Parliament after the election the next year.

References

1520 births
1582 deaths
Politicians from Shropshire
English MPs 1553 (Mary I)
Members of the Parliament of England for West Looe